Steffi Nerius (born 1 July 1972) is a retired German track and field athlete who competed in the javelin throw. During her career, she was a European and World Champion. She also won silver at the 2004 Summer Olympics. Her personal best throw was 68.34 m, set in 2008. This ranks her second among German female javelin throwers, behind Christina Obergföll.

Initially playing volleyball in school, Nerius later switched to athletics. She was taught the javelin throw by her mother, a former javelin thrower. Her first international success was a bronze medal at the 1991 European Junior Championships. Her first gold medal at a major competition came at the 2006 European Championships. From 2003 to 2006 she won four consecutive German Championships.

Achievements

1Old model javelin

References

External links

 
 
 
 Official website
 Leverkusen who's who

1972 births
Living people
People from Bergen auf Rügen
Sportspeople from Mecklenburg-Western Pomerania
German female javelin throwers
German national athletics champions
Athletes (track and field) at the 1996 Summer Olympics
Athletes (track and field) at the 2000 Summer Olympics
Athletes (track and field) at the 2004 Summer Olympics
Athletes (track and field) at the 2008 Summer Olympics
Olympic athletes of Germany
Olympic silver medalists for Germany
Members of the Order of Merit of North Rhine-Westphalia
World Athletics Championships medalists
European Athletics Championships medalists
Medalists at the 2004 Summer Olympics
Olympic silver medalists in athletics (track and field)
World Athletics Championships winners